Espegrend  (also known as Espeland) is a  marine biological field station  located in Bergen, Norway. The station is located close to the airport Flesland, 20 kilometers south of Bergen.

Overview 
The Department of Biological Sciences at the University of Bergen has specialized laboratories and research installations in the main campus in downtown Bergen. It is also responsible for the Marine biological field station at Espeland. The Station  is located in the Raunefjord, with deep sea fauna easily available. The station has good mesocosm facilities, a research vessel RV Aurelia, and good facilities for benthic and planktonic sampling. Espegrend has a number of specialised facilities. It is well known for is mesocosm facility. Espegrend has very good access to diverse and well described marine habitats and model environments. The station comprises a boarding house, boats, laboratories and basic equipment for marine research.

References

External links
 Official website
Espegrend picture gallery

University of Bergen
Buildings and structures in Bergen
Marine biological stations